Homer Cary Elias (May 1, 1955 – October 3, 2001) was an American football  guard who played seven seasons for the Detroit Lions in the National Football League (NFL). After playing collegiate football at Tennessee State University, Elias appeared in 96 career NFL games, with a 39 average.

He was a fourth-round selection (107th overall) in the 1978 NFL Draft by the Detroit Lions which had acquired the pick along with Freddie Scott from the Baltimore Colts for Herb Orvis one day earlier on May 1, 1978.

Homer Elias died on October 3, 2001 of an apparent heart attack. He was 46 years old.

References

1955 births
2001 deaths
American football offensive linemen
Tennessee State Tigers football players
Detroit Lions players